Gerardo Mejía (born April 16, 1965), better known by his mononym Gerardo, is an Ecuadorian-born American rapper, singer and actor who later became a recording industry executive, and more recently a pastor. Born in Guayaquil, Ecuador, he moved with his family to Glendale, California, when he was 12 years old.

Based in Los Angeles, California, Gerardo became known for his bandana, skintight jeans, locking, and shirtless torso. He sometimes refers to himself as the "Latin Elvis" or the "Latin Frank Sinatra".

Career
Gerardo's first major appearance in show business was as Ricky in the 1987 feature film Can't Buy Me Love.<ref name="IMDB">{{IMDb name|id=0577226|name=Gerardo Mejía}}</ref> He was later cast as the character Bird in the 1988 film Colors, about South Central Los Angeles gang violence.  This was also the first time his dance skills were showcased, in one of the party scenes; however, he did not sing at any point in the film.

His hit single "Rico Suave" appeared on his 1991 debut album, Mo' Ritmo. The album peaked at No. 36 on the Billboard 200 chart in June 1991; the single had peaked at No. 7 in April. This song, as well as some others of Gerardo's, include verses with lines in both English and Spanish. Although his following single "We Want the Funk" (a semi-remake of Parliament's "Give Up the Funk") peaked at No. 16, the popularity of "Rico Suave" has made Gerardo known as a one-hit wonder via sources including MTV, VH1, Synthesis Magazine and even Gerardo himself.

As an A&R executive at Interscope Records, Gerardo signed rapper Bubba Sparxxx. More recently, in a 2013 appearance on Katie Couric's show Katie, Gerardo discussed his newest life focus as a Christian youth pastor. He was ordained as a pastor at Praise Chapel in Kansas City and now pastors a church House of Grace in Ashland, Kentucky. 

Personal life
Gerardo is married to Kathy Eicher, a former pageant titleholder who was Miss West Virginia USA 1989, and they have three children: Nadia, Bianca, and Jaden. Nadia is a model who competed in pageants like her mother, and won the title of Miss California USA 2016.  They also have a granddaughter, Lily. They live in Kentucky.

 Discography 
 Albums 
{| class="wikitable" style="text-align:center;"
|-
! rowspan="2"| Year
! rowspan="2"| Album details
! colspan="2"| Chart Positions
|- style="font-size:smaller;"
! style="width:45px;"| US
! style="width:45px;"| USR&B
|-
| 1991
| style="text-align:left;"| Mo' Ritmo Released: January 29, 1991
 Label: Interscope Records
| 36
| 64
|-
| 1992
| style="text-align:left;"| 'Dos Released: September 15, 1992
 Label: Interscope Records
| —
| —
|-
| 1994
| style="text-align:left;"| Así Es Released: May 31, 1994
 Label: EMI Records
| —
| —
|-
| 1995
| style="text-align:left;"| Derrumbe Released: June 6, 1995
 Label: EMI Records
| —
| —
|-
| 2001
| style="text-align:left;"| Gerardo: Fame, Sex y Dinero Released: October 9, 2001
 Label: Thump Records
| —
| —
|-
| 2004
| style="text-align:left;"| 180° Released: September 28, 2004
 Label: Univision Records
| —
| —
|-
|2007
|La Iglesia de la Calle Released: October 23, 2007
 Label: Machete Music
|—
|—
|-
|TBA
|Luces, cámara y unción'''
Announced: 2009
 Label: Interscope Records
|—
|—
|-
| colspan="10" style="text-align:center; font-size:8pt;"| "—" denotes the album failed to chart or not released
|}

Singles
 "Rico Suave" (1991; No. 7 US Billboard Hot 100), No. 87 in Australia.
 "We Want the Funk" (1991; No. 16 US Billboard Hot 100) No. 128 in Australia.
 "When the Lights Go Out" (1991; No. 98 US Billboard'' Hot 100)
 "Latin Till I Die (Oye Como Va)" (1991)
 "Here Kitty Kitty" (1992)
 "Love" (1992)
 "Maria Elisa" (1994)
 "Ae-Ah" (featuring The Outhere Brothers) (1998)
 "Americana" (2004)
 "Sueña" (2005)
 "Raperito" (featuring Vico C) (2007)
 "Agua Amarga" (featuring Funky) (2021)
 "Eres bueno" (featuring Alex Zurdo & Frankie J) (2021)

Filmography

References

External links

 

1965 births
Living people
People from Guayaquil
Ecuadorian emigrants to the United States
Hip hop singers
Rappers from California
20th-century American rappers
21st-century American rappers
Hispanic and Latino American rappers
Naturalized citizens of the United States